Carmen is a French opera by Georges Bizet.

 Carmen (novella), an 1845 story by Prosper Mérimée and the basis for Bizet's opera

Carmen may also refer to:

Arts and entertainment

Film
 Carmen (1913 film), by Stanner E. V. Taylor
 Carmen (1915 Cecil B. DeMille film)
 Carmen (1915 Raoul Walsh film)
 Carmen (1918 film), by Ernst Lubitsch
 Carmen (1926 film), by Jacques Feyder
 Carmen (1932 film), by Cecil Arthur Lewis
 Carmen (1942 film), by Christian-Jaque
 Carmen (1943 film), by Luis César Amadori
 Carmen (1953 film), by Giuseppe Maria Scotese
 Carmen (1983 film), by Carlos Saura
 Carmen (1984 film), by Francesco Rosi
 Carmen (2003 film), by Vicente Aranda
 Carmen (2003 Russian film), by Aleksandr Khvan
 Carmen (2021 film), by Valerie Buhagiar
 Carmen (2022 film), by Benjamin Millepied
 Carmen: A Hip Hopera, a 2001 television film by Robert Townsend
 Carmen Jones (film), a 1954 film by Otto Preminger

Music
 Carmen (Barney Kessel album), 1959
 Carmen, an EP by Carmen Rasmusen
 "Carmen", a 1964 guitar instrumental by Rob E.G.
 Carmen, a 1968 instrumental by Herb Alpert and the Tijuana Brass
 Carmen (band), a 1970s group 
 "Carmen", a 1971 song by Ronnie Tober
 Carmen Brasilia, a 1972 instrumental by Anarchic System
 "Carmen", a 1984 song by Malcolm McLaren from Fans, which also interpolates pieces from the opera Carmen
 "Carmen", a 1990 song by Anything Box from Peace
 Carmen: Duets & Arias, a 2010 album by Andrea Bocelli
 "Carmen" (Lana Del Rey song), 2012
 "Carmen" (Stromae song), 2015

Other works
 Carmen (1949 ballet), by Roland Petit
 Carmen Suite (ballet), choreographed by Alberto Alonso, 1967, to music by Russian composer Rodion Shchedrin based on Bizet's opera
 Carmen (Wildhorn musical), 2008

People
 Carmen (given name)
 Carmen (surname)

Places

Philippines
 Carmen, Agusan del Norte
 Carmen, Bohol
 Carmen, Cebu
 Carmen, Cotabato
 Carmen, Davao del Norte
 Carmen, Surigao del Sur
 Del Carmen, Surigao del Norte

United States
 Carmen, Arizona
 Carmen, Idaho
 Carmen, Oklahoma

Other places
 Carmen (municipality), Campeche, Mexico
 Carmen (district), San José Canton, Costa Rica
 Ciudad del Carmen, Campeche, Mexico
 Carmen, Uruguay
 Alto del Carmen, Atacama Region, Chile
 Karmøy or Carmen, an island of Norway
 Playa del Carmen, a city in Quintana Roo state, Mexico

Other uses
 Carmen (verse), the Latin word for "chant", "song", and hence "lyrics" or "poem"
 Hispano-Suiza Carmen, an electric sports car
 List of storms named Carmen

See also
 El Carmen (disambiguation)
 
 Carman (disambiguation)
 Carmin (disambiguation)
 Carmine (disambiguation)